Blaavand melder storm is a 1938 Danish thriller film directed by Lau Lauritzen Jr. and Alice O'Fredericks.

Cast
 Osvald Helmuth as Fiskeskipper Jens Olesen
 Frits Helmuth as Jens Olesen som barn
 Betty Söderberg as Anna Olesen
 Ellen Løjmar as Johanne Olesen
 Lise Thomsen as Inger
 Axel Frische as Fiskeskipper Christian Larsen
 Lau Lauritzen, Jr. as Svend Larsen
 John Price as Thorsten Larsen
 Johanne Fritz-Petersen as Karen
 Sigurd Langberg as Fiskeskipper Mads Olsen
 Carl Fischer as Fiskeskipper Claus Mikkelsen
 Carl Heger as Førstemand på 'Frida'
 Erik Malberg as Hjælper på 'Frida'
 Elith Foss as Kokkedreng på 'Frida'
 Gunnar Lauring as Førstemand på 'Falken'
 Thorkil Lauritzen as Kokkedreng på 'Falken'

References

External links

1938 films
1938 thriller films
1930s Danish-language films
Danish black-and-white films
Films directed by Lau Lauritzen Jr.
Films directed by Alice O'Fredericks
Danish thriller films